Henry William Seymour (July 21, 1834 – April 7, 1906) was a politician from the U.S. state of Michigan.

Seymour was born in Brockport, New York and attended the public schools, Brockport Collegiate Institute, and Canandaigua Academy. He graduated from Williams College of Williamstown, Massachusetts in 1855.  He studied law in Albany, New York taking lectures at Albany Law School and was admitted to the bar in May 1856, but never practiced.

Seymour engaged in mercantile pursuits in Brockport until 1872 when he moved to Sault Ste. Marie, Michigan where he engaged in the manufacture of reapers and subsequently in the manufacture of lumber and in agricultural pursuits.  He was a member of the Michigan House of Representatives from Cheboygan District, 1880–1882 and a member of the Michigan Senate 1882–1884 (31st District) and 1886–1888 (30th District).

In a special election on February 14, 1888, to fill the vacancy caused by the death of Seth C. Moffatt, Seymour was elected as a Republican from Michigan's 11th congressional district to the 50th Congress, serving from February 14, 1888, to March 3, 1889.  He was an unsuccessful candidate for re-nomination in 1888, losing to fellow Republican Samuel M. Stephenson in the primaries.

Henry W. Seymour died at the age of seventy-one, while on a visit, in Washington, D.C.  He is interred at Lakeview Cemetery of Brockport.

References

The Political Graveyard

External links 
 

1834 births
1906 deaths
Republican Party members of the Michigan House of Representatives
Albany Law School alumni
Williams College alumni
Republican Party Michigan state senators
People from Sault Ste. Marie, Michigan
Republican Party members of the United States House of Representatives from Michigan
Burials in New York (state)
19th-century American politicians